Kota Samarahan is a town in Sarawak, Malaysia.

Kota Samarahan may also refer to:

Kota Samarahan (federal constituency), a federal constituency in Sarawak, Malaysia.

See also
Samarahan (disambiguation)